Bardbarian is a multi-platform indie game developed by TreeFortress Games and published by Bulkypix in 2014.

Development
It was built using Adobe AIR platform with the Starling Framework, and the ActionScript port of Spriter for the SpriteSheets.

Release
Bardbarian was released for iOS on January 16, 2014, for Android's Amazon Appstore on February 14 and Google Play on March 13, and for Windows and Mac OS X on April 1, 2014. After being greenlit by the community, it was released on Steam on April 1, 2014, and featured characters from fellow indie games Octodad: Dadliest Catch, Shellrazer, Super Meat Boy and The Binding of Isaac. The iOS version of the game became part of GameClub in April 2020.

Reception

The iOS version received "favorable" reviews, while the PC version received unfavorable reviews, according to the review aggregation website Metacritic.

References

External links
 

2014 video games
Android (operating system) games
BulkyPix games
GameClub games
IOS games
MacOS games
Role-playing video games
Shooter video games
Single-player video games
Steam Greenlight games
Tower defense video games
Video games developed in Canada
Windows games
TreeFortress Games games